Stormontfield is a village in Perth and Kinross, Scotland, about  north of Perth. It is located on the eastern banks of the River Tay, on the opposite side to Luncarty.

St. David's Chapel, a Category B listed building, is located on Cambusmichael Road, the village's main thoroughfare. It dates to 1897 and is the work of Alexander Marshall Mackenzie.

Gallery

References

External links
Stormontfield Heritage
Photographs in and around Stormontfield - Geograph.co.uk

Villages in Perth and Kinross